The 2022 Nebraska Cornhuskers football team represented the University of Nebraska as a member of the West Division of the Big Ten Conference during the 2022 NCAA Division I FBS football season. The team played their home games at Memorial Stadium in Lincoln, Nebraska.

After starting the season with two losses in their first three games, head coach Scott Frost was fired on September 11; receivers coach and associate head coach Mickey Joseph was named interim head coach for the remainder of the season. The following week, after having given up nearly school record number of yards to opposing offenses in back-to-back weeks, Nebraska dismissed defensive coordinator Erik Chinander and promoted assistant Bill Busch to the position for the remainder of the season.

On November 26, 2022, Nebraska announced the hiring of Matt Rhule to become the 31st head coach of the Nebraska football program.

Previous season
The Cornhuskers finished the 2021 season 3–9, 1–8 in Big Ten play to finish in a tie for last place in the West division.

Preseason

Award watch lists

Big Ten Media Days

Preseason Media Poll

The annual Cleveland.com Preseason Big Ten Media Poll.

Schedule

Personnel

Roster

Depth chart

Game summaries

vs Northwestern (Ireland)

vs North Dakota (FCS)

vs Georgia Southern

vs No. 6 Oklahoma

vs Indiana

at Rutgers

at Purdue

vs No. 17 Illinois

vs Minnesota

at No. 3 Michigan

vs Wisconsin

at Iowa

Big Ten Awards

Player of the Week Honors

All-Conference Awards

2022 Big Ten Offense All-Conference Teams and Awards

Rankings

References

Nebraska
Nebraska Cornhuskers football seasons
Nebraska Cornhuskers football